Slovenia was represented by Vili Resnik in the Eurovision Song Contest 1998 with the song "Naj bogovi slišijo".

Before Eurovision

EMA 1998 
EMA 1998 was the 4th edition of the Slovenian national final format Evrovizijska Melodija (EMA). The competition was used by RTV Slovenija to select Slovenia's entry for the Eurovision Song Contest 1998.

Competing entries 
43 entries were received by RTV Slovenija during a submission period. An expert committee consisting of Miša Molk, Andrej Karoli and Mojmir Sepe selected fourteen artists and songs for the competition from the received submissions.

Final 
EMA 1998 took place on 28 February 1998 at the RTV Slovenija studios in Ljubljana, hosted by Mojca Mavec. A public vote selected "Naj bogovi slišijo" performed by Vili Resnik as the winner.

At Eurovision 
Heading into the final of the contest, BBC reported that bookmakers ranked the entry 19th out of the 25 entries.

Voting

References

1998
Countries in the Eurovision Song Contest 1998
Eurovision